Joseph Teate was an Anglican priest in Ireland during the seventeenth century.

Teate was educated at Trinity College, Dublin. He was the Archdeacon of Ossory from 1661 to 1668; and Dean of Ossory from 1668 to 1671.

References

Archdeacons of Ossory
Deans of Ossory
17th-century Irish Anglican priests
Alumni of Trinity College Dublin